Lekarevka is a rural locality (a village) in Taptykovsky Selsoviet, Ufimsky District, Bashkortostan, Russia. The population was 146 as of 2010. There are 17 streets.

Geography 
Lekarevka is located 31 km southwest of Ufa (the district's administrative centre) by road. Glumilino is the nearest rural locality.

References 

Rural localities in Ufimsky District